Charles Addy McIlveen (March 9, 1910 – July 26, 1972) was a Canadian politician. He served in the Legislative Assembly of New Brunswick from 1960 to 1972 as member of the Progressive Conservative party.

References

1910 births
1972 deaths
Politicians from Saint John, New Brunswick
Progressive Conservative Party of New Brunswick MLAs